Atrypanius polyspilus is a species of beetle in the family Cerambycidae. It was described by Adam White in 1855.

References

Beetles described in 1855